The demography of England has since 1801 been measured by the decennial national census, and is marked by centuries of population growth and urbanization. Due to the lack of authoritative contemporary sources, estimates of the population of England for dates prior to the first census in 1801 vary considerably. The population of England at the 2021 census was 56,489,800.

Population

The population of England in 2021 was estimated to be 56,489,800. This is the most recent census. In the previous census, in 2011, the population was 53,012,456.

Data for the 2011 census:
 Male: 26,069,148
 Female: 26,943,308
 Total: 53,012,456
 Total Fertility Rate: 1.97

Historical population

Vital statistics
 This is UK wide information.

(c) = Census results.

In 2019 70.5% of all babies were born to UK-born mothers while 29.5% were born to foreign-born mothers of which 10.8% came from the EU and 18.7% from non-EU countries.

Current vital statistics

Historical percent distribution of the total population by age

Country of birth
Country of birth given by respondents in the corresponding UK censuses were as follows:

Below are the estimates of the largest foreign-born groups in England according to ONS estimates.

Age

The data below is based on the 2011 census. In 2001, the mean age of England's population was 38.60, and the median age was 37.00.

Ethnicity

Notes for table above

Population distribution

Ethnicity of school pupils 
The ethnicity of school pupils in England has been changing since the figures started to be collected in 2002, White British students proportionally have been in decline compared to other groups who have risen.

Languages

The most common main languages spoken in England according to the 2011 census are shown below.

Religion

Respondents to the 2001, 2011 and 2021 censuses gave their religions as follows:

See also 
Demographics of the United Kingdom
Demography of Scotland
Demography of Wales
Demography of Northern Ireland
Demography of London
Demography of Birmingham
Demography of Greater Manchester
 United Kingdom Census 2011
 National Statistics Socio-economic Classification
 Census 2001 Ethnic Codes
 List of English districts by population
 List of urban areas in England by population
 List of towns and cities in England by historical population
 List of major settlements by population in English counties

Notes

References

External links
National Statistics
Populstat population figure site – main source for 1801–1991
Genealogical documents

2001 in England
Demographics of England
Ethnic groups in the United Kingdom
History of England by topic
2001 United Kingdom census